Special rapporteur is a title given to individuals working on behalf of various regional and international organizations who bear specific mandates to investigate, monitor and recommend solutions to specific human rights problems.

United Nations special rapporteur
African Union special rapporteur
Organization of American States special rapporteur

See also
Rapporteur, a person appointed by an organization to report on the proceedings of its meetings